Ivan Aparecido da Silva (born 25 August 1992), simply known as Ivan, is a Brazilian footballer who plays for Goiás as a right back.

Club career
Born in Jaú, São Paulo, Ivan graduated with Portuguesa's youth setup. On 15 July 2011, he made his first team debut, starting in a 2–1 away win against Boa Esporte for the Série B championship.

Ivan made his Série A debut on 23 June 2012, starting and scoring the game's only in a home success against São Paulo. He would subsequently appear rarely, spending the campaign as a backup to Luis Ricardo.

On 7 February 2014 Ivan signed for Coritiba, being immediately loaned to Campeonato Paulista strugglers Atlético Sorocaba. He returned to Coxa in May, and made his debut for the club on 14 September, playing the full 90 minutes in a 1–2 away loss against Santos.

Honours
Portuguesa
Campeonato Brasileiro Série B: 2011
Campeonato Paulista Série A2: 2013

References

External links
Coritiba official profile 

1992 births
Living people
Footballers from São Paulo (state)
Brazilian footballers
Association football defenders
Campeonato Brasileiro Série A players
Campeonato Brasileiro Série B players
Campeonato Brasileiro Série C players
Associação Portuguesa de Desportos players
Coritiba Foot Ball Club players
Clube Atlético Sorocaba players
Clube Atlético Bragantino players
Esporte Clube Água Santa players
Ituano FC players
Fortaleza Esporte Clube players
ABC Futebol Clube players
Sociedade Esportiva e Recreativa Caxias do Sul players
People from Jaú